Feltville may refer to:

Feltville Historic District, in Union County, New Jersey
Feltville Formation, a mapped bedrock unit, named for the above district